Mouneïssa  is the 1998, first international CD release from  Malian singer/songwriter Rokia Traoré. Its release followed a time of meeting with and guidance from Ali Farka Touré, as well as the support of La Maison de la Culture d’Amiens pour Label Bleu, :fr:Label Bleu which produced the record for the Indigo label. The record is very traditional in its musicality and lyricism and touches upon many folk elements of the Malian people.

Coming from a long history of Malian musicians, Rokia is able to combine poetic metaphor with the different musical elements of her country. For the first time, the balaba (the large balafon of her region, has been paired with the ngoni (instrument) (the instrument favored by Bambara griots).

Release and availability
Originally released in 1998 on HDCD, this recording is currently out of print and more expensive to acquire than the average used cd.

Track listing
 "Laidu" – 6:22
 " Mouneïssa " – 5:39
 "Finini" – 5:06
 "Dianguina" – 5:17
 "Sabali" – 5:04
 "Tchiwara" – 3:41
 "Fatalité" – 4:40
 "Sakanto" – 4:28
 "Sé" – 5:35

Personnel
 Rokia Traoré - Chants
 Andra Kouyaté – N’goni
 Baba Sissoko – N’goni, petites percussions
 Oumar Diallo (musician) – Guitarre basse
 Abdoul Wahab Berthé – Guitare basse
 Samba Diarra – Balafon
 Dimba Camara – Percussions (guita)
 Souleymane Ann – Percussions

Production
 Executive producer: Michel Orier
 Collection director: Christian Mousset
 Production assistant: Martine Patrice
 Recording/Mixing studio: Studio Gil Evans d’Amiens
 Recording/Mixing engineer: Philippe Teissier Du Cros
 Recording/Mixing assistant: Pierre Guinot
 Digital Editing: Jean-Pierre Bouquet (L’Autre Studio)
 Front cover and layout: Christophe Rémy
 Color photos: Antonin Potoski
 Black & white photos: Dominique Lagnous
 Liner notes: Fara C
 Translations (French): Mariam Lainé
 Translations (English): Stéphanie Carwin
 English song summaries: Philippa Wehle
 Special thanks: Ali Farka Touré, la Mission de Coopération et d’Action Culturelle de la France au Mali, l’Office de Radio Télévision du Mali, l’Institut National des Arts du Mali, toute l’equipe Label Blue/Indigo et le Centre Cultural Français de Bamako. Avec l’aimable contribution de Massambou Wellé Diallo.

References

External links
 Label Bleu official website 
 Rokia Traoré official website 
 Music of Mali on Wikipedia Music of Mali

1998 albums
Rokia Traoré albums